Mtumba is an administrative ward in the Dodoma Urban district of the Dodoma Region of Tanzania. The ward is along the main road to Dar es salaam. Residence in this ward depended btradionally much on Agricultural activities as well as Animal keeping. Since 2016 the new "Government City" housing the headquarters of ministries and government institutions has become functional in Mtumba.

In 2016 the Tanzania National Bureau of Statistics report there were 7,277 people in the ward, from 17,268 in 2012.

References

Wards of Dodoma Region